Five ships of the Royal Navy have been named HMS Hampshire after the English county:

 was a 46-gun ship launched in 1653 and sunk in 1697 in action with the French ship Pelican in Hudson Bay during the War of the Grand Alliance.
 was a 48-gun fourth rate launched in 1698 and broken up in 1739.
 was a 50-gun fourth rate launched in 1741 and broken up in 1766.
 was a  armoured cruiser launched in 1903 and sunk by a mine in 1916.
 was a  guided missile destroyer launched in 1963 and scrapped in 1979.

References

Royal Navy ship names